Carneiro is a surname. 

Carneiro may also refer to: 

 Carneiro, a parish in the municipality of Amarante in Portugal
 Carneiro Township, Ellsworth County, Kansas, a township in Ellsworth County, Kansas
 General Carneiro, a city in the Brazilian state of Paraná
 General Carneiro, Mato Grosso, a city in the Brazilian state of Mato Grosso
 Piquet Carneiro, a city in the Brazilian state of Ceará
 Francisco Sá Carneiro Airport, Portuguese airport
 Joinville-Lauro Carneiro de Loyola Airport, Brazilian airport